Christ Joël Junior Tiéhi (born 16 June 1998) is a French born Ivorian professional footballer who plays as a midfielder for EFL Championship club Wigan, on loan from Slovan Liberec.

Club career
A youth product of Le Havre AC since 2009, Tiéhi signed his first professional contract on 17 May 2018. He made his senior debut for Le Havre in a 2–0 Coupe de la Ligue win over Football Bourg-en-Bresse Péronnas 01 on 14 August 2018.

On 23 September 2019, it was confirmed that Tiéhi had moved to Woking. On 12 October 2019, Tiéhi joined National League South side, Tonbridge Angels on a dual-registration basis, making his debut in a 5–1 victory over Braintree Town on the same day. On 6 February 2020, it was announced that Christ would be signing for Tonbridge for the remainder of the season. On 21 September 2020, despite extending his stay for the 2020–21 campaign, Tiéhi opted to return to France due to personal reasons.

On 21 November 2020, Tiéhi signed for Czech First League side, Opava for the remainder of the campaign and went onto make his debut, starting in a 6–0 home defeat to Slavia Prague. On 11 August 2021, Tiéhi scored his first goal for the club, netting in Opava's 9–0 home victory over Bohumín in the Czech Cup. He went onto score once more, featuring 26 times in total for the club before leaving in September 2021.

On 7 September 2021, Tiéhi was rewarded with a move back to the Czech First League, following Opava's relegation, to join Slovan Liberec and made his debut during a 2–2 draw with Pardubice four days later.

In July 2022, Tiehi joined Slavia Prague on a half-season loan. On 13 January 2023, Tiéhi was loaned to Wigan until the end of the season.

International career
Tiéhi represented the Ivory Coast U20s at the 2017 Toulon Tournament.

Personal life
Born in France, Tiéhi is the son of the Ivorian former international footballer Joël Tiéhi. His younger brother is Jean-Pierre Tiéhi.

Career statistics

References

External links
 
 
 HAC Foot Profile
 Toulon Tournament Profile

1998 births
Living people
Footballers from Paris
Association football midfielders
Ivorian footballers
Ivory Coast under-20 international footballers
French footballers
French sportspeople of Ivorian descent
Le Havre AC players
Woking F.C. players
Tonbridge Angels F.C. players
SFC Opava players
FC Slovan Liberec players
SK Slavia Prague players
Ligue 2 players
National League (English football) players
Czech First League players
Ivorian expatriate footballers
Ivorian expatriate sportspeople in England
Expatriate footballers in England
Ivorian expatriate sportspeople in the Czech Republic
Expatriate footballers in the Czech Republic
Black French sportspeople
Wigan Athletic F.C. players
English Football League players